Liberal Socialist Party may refer to:

Liberal Socialist Party (Angola)
Liberal Socialist Party (Singapore)
Liberal Socialist Party (Switzerland)
Liberal Socialists Party (Egypt)
Liberal Socialist Action Party, a minor Italian political party